PuTTY is a free and open-source terminal emulator, serial console and network file transfer application. It supports several network protocols, including SCP, SSH, Telnet, rlogin, and raw socket connection. It can also connect to a serial port. The name "PuTTY" has no official meaning.

PuTTY was originally written for Microsoft Windows, but it has been ported to various other operating systems.

PuTTY was written and is maintained primarily by Simon Tatham, a British programmer.

Features
PuTTY supports many variations on the secure remote terminal, and provides user control over the SSH encryption key and protocol version, alternate ciphers such as AES, 3DES, RC4, Blowfish, DES, and Public-key authentication. PuTTY uses its own format of key files – PPK (protected by Message Authentication Code). PuTTY supports SSO through GSSAPI, including user provided GSSAPI DLLs. It also can emulate control sequences from xterm, VT220, VT102 or ECMA-48 terminal emulation, and allows local, remote, or dynamic port forwarding with SSH (including X11 forwarding). The network communication layer supports IPv6, and the SSH protocol supports the zlib@openssh.com delayed compression scheme. It can also be used with local serial port connections.

PuTTY comes bundled with command-line SCP and SFTP clients, called "pscp" and "psftp" respectively, and plink, a command-line connection tool, used for non-interactive sessions.

PuTTY does not support session tabs directly, but many wrappers are available that do.

History
PuTTY development began late in 1998, and was a usable SSH-2 client by October 2000.

Components
PuTTY consists of several components:
 PuTTY the Telnet, rlogin, and SSH client itself, which can also connect to a serial port
 PSCP an SCP client, i.e. command-line secure file copy. Can also use SFTP to perform transfers
 PSFTP an SFTP client, i.e. general file transfer sessions much like FTP
 PuTTYtel a Telnet-only client
 Plink a command-line interface to the PuTTY back ends. Usually used for SSH Tunneling
 Pageant an SSH authentication agent for PuTTY, PSCP and Plink
 PuTTYgen an RSA, DSA, ECDSA and EdDSA key generation utility
 pterm (Unix version only) an X11 client which supports the same terminal emulation as PuTTY

See also

Comparison of SSH clients
Tera Term
mintty
WinSCP
minicom

References

External links

1998 software
Cross-platform free software
Cryptographic software
Free communication software
Free software programmed in C
Free terminal emulators
Portable software
Secure Shell
SSH File Transfer Protocol clients
Software using the MIT license
Symbian software
Telnet